Ben Prescott (born 31 July 1978 in Tripoli, Libya) is a Libyan born Scottish former rugby union player for Glasgow Warriors at the Tighthead Prop position.

Amateur career

Prescott played for Aberdeen GSFP. He also played for Blackrock College RFC when based in Ireland with Leinster in 2010.

Professional career

Prescott started playing for Glasgow Warriors in the 2001–02 season under Richie Dixon. His first match was the pre-season friendly against Northampton Saints where he came on as a substitute on 14 August 2001.

He also played in competitive matches. His first competitive appearance was against Cardiff RFC in the Heineken Cup replacing Dave Hilton on 4 November 2001 at Hughenden Stadium.

He played in the Welsh-Scottish League against Edinburgh Rugby, coming on as a temporary replacement for Steve Griffiths on 22 February 2002

He didn't play for the Warriors again until season 2004–05.  He signed full-time for the Warriors in 2005.

The following season 2006–07 a calf injury restricted his Warriors appearances. He went out on loan to Waterloo for more game time. The 2007–08 season was his last as a Warrior.

The 2007–08 season saw Prescott on a loan to Rotherham Titans. This move was made permanent on 23 May 2008.

He left the Titans to join Nottingham RFC in May 2010.

He then moved on to Leinster in September 2010.

He rejoined the Titans on loan in early December 2010 when their prop Anton O'Donnell broke his ankle.

That move was brief as he moved on a short-term deal to Northampton Saints at the end of December 2010.

He rejoined Nottingham for season 2011–12.

In May 2012 he signed for the Cornish Pirates. He rejected a new contract in the summer of 2014 and was released.

Instead Prescott signed for London Scottish for the 2014–15 season. He announced his retiral from the game in September 2015 due to a neck and shoulder injury.

International career

Prescott played for Scotland U18s, Scottish Universities and Scottish Students.

External links 

The Rugby Paper profile

References 

1978 births
Living people
Glasgow Warriors players
Scottish rugby union players
Aberdeen GSFP RFC players
Blackrock College RFC players
Leinster Rugby players
Waterloo R.F.C. players
Rotherham Titans players
Nottingham R.F.C. players
Northampton Saints players
Cornish Pirates players
London Scottish F.C. players
People from Tripoli, Libya
Rugby union props